Saint-Germain-de-Livet is a commune south of Lisieux in the Calvados department in the Normandy region in northwestern France.

History
The famous chateau at Saint-Germain-de-Livet, now open to the public, was built by the Tournebu (later Tournebu-de-Livet) family between 1561 and 1578.

Population

See also
Communes of the Calvados department

References

External links
 château Saint-Germain-de-Livet, medieval history note on the château Saint-Germain-de-Livet

Communes of Calvados (department)
Calvados communes articles needing translation from French Wikipedia